Zhe with diaeresis (Ӝ ӝ; italics: Ӝ ӝ) is a letter of the Cyrillic script. Its form is derived from the Cyrillic letter Zhe (Ж ж Ж ж).

It is usually romanized as ⟨dž⟩.

Computing codes

See also
Cyrillic characters in Unicode

References

Cyrillic letters with diacritics
Letters with diaeresis